Shimamura (written: 島村 or 嶋村 lit. "island village") is a Japanese surname. Notable people with the surname include:

Arthur P. Shimamura (1954–2020), American psychologist
, Japanese volleyball player
, Imperial Japanese Navy admiral
, Japanese photographer
, Japanese baseball player
, Japanese anthropologist
, Japanese nude model, gravure idol, television personality and actress
, Japanese voice actress
, Japanese footballer
, Japanese photographer
, Japanese footballer
, Japanese Go player
, Japanese writer
, Japanese footballer
, Japanese actor
, Japanese politician
, Japanese voice actress

Fictional characters
, a character in the manga series Cyborg 009
, a character in the video game The Idolmaster Cinderella Girls

See also
Shimomura

Japanese-language surnames